Scaevola basedowii  is an erect multi-stemmed shrub in the family Goodeniaceae, endemic to Western Australia, the Northern Territory and South Australia.

Description
Scaevola basedowii is an erect, multi-stemmed shrub which grows to 60 cm high, which often spreads by cloning. The stems are ribbed, and 
have tiny gland-tipped hairs, as well as short stiff non-glandular hairs, and
scattered longer, non-glandular hairs. The sessile, leaves are alternate, with the lower leaves being well developed while the upper leaves often resembling scales. The leaf blades can vary from oblong to elliptic, lanceolate or triangular and are entire. They can be sparsely or densely hairy with hairs of the same type as the stems and are 2.5 –21 mm long by 2–4 mm wide. The stalked, five-lobed flowers have a tube greater than one-third their total length. Each lobe has marginal wings. The pale-purplish to white corolla is split on one side almost to the base. The corolla is bearded inside the throat.  There are five stamens, and the style is surmounted by a cup (indusium) which holds the shed pollen, and wraps the two-lobed stigma. The indusium is covered in dense, whitish bristles, with shorter bristles around the opening. The ovary is ellipsoid, with two cells and is densely hairy. The fruit is ellipsoid, with the calyx persisting at its base.

In Western Australia it flowers from May to December. In the Northern Territory it has been found flowering and fruiting from January to December, and the South Australian description describes it as flowering any time of the year.

Scaevola basedowii is like both S. depauperata and S. parvifolia subsp. parvifolia. 
Scaevola depauperata differs from S.basedowii in having smooth stems or stems with very inconspicuous minute hairs. 
Scaevola parvifolia subsp. parvifolia has a shorter calyx (1–2 mm long) with united lobes for less than one third the calyx length versus a calyx of 2-3.5 mm in S.basedowii. An additional difference is that the stems of S. parvifolia subsp. parvifolia are felty to the touch, having a longer and denser hair layer.

It has no synonyms.

Distribution & habitat
In Western AustraliaScaevola basedowii is found in the IBRA bioregions of Central Ranges, Coolgardie, Gibson Desert, Great Sandy Desert, Great Victoria Desert, Little Sandy Desert, and Murchison ( or more simply, in Beard's Eremaean Province).

In the Northern Territory, it is found in the IBRA bioregions of Burt Plain, Central Ranges, Finke, Gibson Desert, Great Sandy Desert, Great Victoria Desert, MacDonnell Ranges, and Tanami.
In South Australia it occurs in the northwest of the state (no IBRA regions given).

It is found on sand dunes and sandplains.

Taxonomy
Scaevola basedowii was first described in 1980 by Roger Carolin in an article in the journal, Telopea.

Etymology
The genus name, Scaevola,  is Latin, a diminutive of scaeva, the left-handed, referring to the left-handed Roman, Gaius Mucius Scaevola, made famous by Livy, the flower being so like a hand. The specific epithet, basedowii, honours the collector of the type specimen, Herbert Basedow (1881-1933).

References

External links
 Scaevola basedowii: Occurrence data from the Australasian Virtual Herbarium
 Flora of Australia: Scaevola basedowii Carolin

basedowii
Eudicots of Western Australia
Asterales of Australia
Plants described in 1980
Taxa named by Roger Charles Carolin
Flora of South Australia
Flora of the Northern Territory